London Underground is an album by flautist Herbie Mann recorded in London in 1973 and released on the Atlantic label. The album features Mann with British rock musicians performing versions of contemporary British hit singles.

Reception

The Allmusic site awarded the album 3 stars stating: "There are a couple of clunkers here ("Layla" doesn't work), but for fans of late-'60s/early-'70s rock, not a bad ride".

Track listing 
 "Bitch" (Mick Jagger, Keith Richards) - 8:21
 "Something in the Air" (Speedy Keen) - 3:34
 "Layla" (Eric Clapton, Jim Gordon) - 8:08
 "Spin Ball" (Paddy Kingsland) - 1:57
 "Mellow Yellow" (Donovan Leitch) - 3:15
 "A Whiter Shade of Pale" (Gary Brooker, Keith Reid) - 4:46
 "Memphis Spoon Bread & Dover Sole" (Herbie Mann) - 3:50
 "Paper Sun" (Jim Capaldi, Steve Winwood) - 6:41
 "You Never Give Me Your Money" (John Lennon, Paul McCartney) - 4:05

Personnel 
Herbie Mann - flute
Pat Rebillot - keyboards 
Albert Lee - electric guitar, acoustic guitar
Mick Taylor - guitar (tracks 1–3, 6 & 7)
Al Gorry (track 5), Calvin "Fuzzy" Samuels (tracks 1-4 & 6-8) - bass
Aynsley Dunbar (tracks 1, 3–5, 7 & 8), Robbie McIntosh (tracks 2 & 6) - drums
Armen Halburian - percussion (track 8)
Ian McDonald - alto saxophone (track 1)
Stéphane Grappelli - violin (track 5)
Technical
Gary Martin - engineer
Ahmet Ertegun - executive producer
Paulo Bisacca - art direction, design
Giuseppe Pino - photography

References 

Herbie Mann albums
1974 albums
Atlantic Records albums